Manchester Road can refer to (among many roads with this name):

Parts of the A6 road in England
Parts of the A57 road in England
Part of the A1206 road in London
Part of Missouri Route 100 in the USA